In the World: From Natchez to New York is the solo debut album by the jazz cornetist Olu Dara, released in 1998. Dara also sings and plays guitar on the album.

The album peaked at No. 19 on the Billboard Traditional Jazz Albums chart.

Critical reception
The Washington Post wrote: "Mixing up sly humor and evocative description, Dara's singing slips and slides around the steady guitar rhythms, which borrow equally from Delta blues, Caribbean calypso and West African high-life."

Track listing
"Okra" – 4:48
"Rain Shower" – 4:34
"Natchez Shopping Blues" – 3:34
"Your Lips" – 3:58
"Harlem Country Girl" – 5:47
"Zora" – 3:14
"Young Mama" – 4:44
"Bubber (If Only)" – 3:04
"Father Blues" – 3:32
"Jungle Jay" featuring Nas – 5:02
"Kiane" – 4:32

References

1998 albums
Atlantic Records albums
Olu Dara albums